Mauritia grayana, the 'Gray's arabica cowry', is a species of sea snail, a cowry, a marine gastropod mollusk in the family Cypraeidae, the cowries.

Subspecies
 Mauritia grayana grayana Schilder, 1930
 Mauritia grayana ngai Thach, 2020

Description
Mauritia grayana has an oval, smooth and shiny shell. The dorsum surface is light gray-brown, with several gray spots and many thin longitudinal lines. In the middle of dorsum there is a wide longitudinal stripe. Close to the edges there is a grayish wide frame with several dark brown spots. The base is pale brown, with a wide aperture and fine dark brown teeth on outer and inner lips. In the living cowries the mantle is well developed, quite grayish and almost transparent, with short papillae and external antennae.

Distribution
This Arabian endemic species is distributed in the Red Sea and in the Western Indian Ocean along Eritrea, Somalia and Pakistan.

Habitat
During the day the living cowries are usually hidden in coral caves or beneath the reef block, as they fear the light. They start feeding at dawn or dusk on sponges or coral polyps.

References

 Schilder F.A. & Schilder M. (1938-1939). Prodrome of a monograph on living Cypraeidae. Proceedings of the Malacological Society of London. 23(3): 109-180
 Fishelson, L., 1971. Ecology and distribution of the benthic fauna in the shallow waters of the Red Sea. Mar. Biol., Berl. 10 2: 113-133
 Felix Lorenz and Alex Hubert : A Guide to Worldwide Cowries, second revised edition - Conch Books, 2002
 Fishelson, L., 1971 - Ecology and distribution of the benthic fauna in the shallow waters of the Red Sea - Mar. Biol., Berl. 10 2: 113-133
 Burgess, C.M. (1970) - The Living Cowries - AS Barnes and Co, Ltd. Cranbury, New Jersey

External links

 Biolib
 WoRMS
 Xenophora

Cypraeidae
Gastropods described in 1930